McManners, also spelt MacManners, is a surname. It is considered a variant spelling of McManus.

Notable people with the surname include:

Hugh McManners (born 1952), English television presenter and writer
John McManners (1916–2006), English academic and historian
Joseph McManners (born 1992), English singer-songwriter, musician, and actor

References